Dubravice may refer to the following places:

 Dubravice (Bratunac), a village in Bosnia and Herzegovina
 Dubravice (Konjic), a village in Bosnia and Herzegovina
 Dubravice, Croatia, a village near Skradin

See also
 Dubravica (disambiguation)